Dakota Dunes is an unincorporated community and census-designated place (CDP), master-planned residential and commercial development covering about  in Union County in the extreme southeast corner of the U.S. state of South Dakota. The population was 4,020 at the 2020 census.

Demographics

Overview
The development is sandwiched between the Big Sioux River and the Missouri River. The nearest incorporated municipality is North Sioux City, South Dakota, with which Dakota Dunes shares the zip code 57049. Dakota Dunes is about five miles (8 km) west of downtown Sioux City, Iowa.
As of March 31, 2013, its population stood at 2,688.
Law enforcement is provided by the Union County Sheriff.

Dakota Dunes has five main neighborhoods including the Country Club Estates, the Meadows, the Prairie, the Willows, and Upscale Apartment Living.

Dakota Dunes is owned and developed by Berkshire Hathaway Energy of Des Moines, Iowa, which unveiled plans for the community in 1988. The development is home to Dakota Dunes Country Club, a golf course designed by Arnold Palmer's design company.  Two Rivers Golf Club, which existed as the Sioux City Boat Club prior to the existence of Dakota Dunes, is also nearby. KMEG-14/KPTH Fox-44 studios are also within the vicinity.

In 2011 and 2019, historic flooding along the Big Sioux and Missouri Rivers threatened the town.

References

External links
 Dakota Dunes website

Unincorporated communities in South Dakota
Unincorporated communities in Union County, South Dakota